The Shama constituency is in the Western region of Ghana. The inhabitants of the town are mostly engaged in fishing and its related activities such as fish processing for local markets. The town has 20946 inhabitants. The town is in the Shama District.

See also
List of Ghana Parliament constituencies

References 

Parliamentary constituencies in the Western Region (Ghana)